Julian Vaughn (born December 16, 1988) is an American professional basketball player who last played for Indios de San Francisco de Macorís of the Liga Nacional de Baloncesto. He is a 2.08 m (6 ft 10 in) tall power forward-center.

College career
Vaughn played college basketball at Florida State University, with the Florida State Seminoles in 2007–08, and at Georgetown University, with the Georgetown Hoyas, from 2008 to 2011.

Professional career
After going undrafted at the 2011 NBA draft, Vaughn signed with the Belgian League club Antwerp Giants for the 2011–12 season.

In August 2012, he moved to the Cypriot League club Keravnos for the 2012–13 season. In the summer of 2013, he played with the Indios de San Francisco of Dominican Republic.

In September 2013, he moved to the Greek League club KAOD for the 2013–14 season. On August 1, 2015, he signed a one-year deal with another Greek club PAOK.

On July 8, 2015, he signed a one-year deal with ČEZ Nymburk.

On August 19, 2016, he signed a two-year deal with Polish club Stelmet Zielona Góra. On February 13, 2017, he parted ways with Zielona Góra.

References

External links
Eurocup Profile
FIBA Europe Profile
Eurobasket.com Profile
Draftexpress.com Profile
Greek Basket League Profile 
Georgetown Hoyas College Profile 
Sports-Reference College Stats

1988 births
Living people
American expatriate basketball people in Belgium
American expatriate basketball people in Cyprus
American expatriate basketball people in Greece
American expatriate basketball people in Poland
American expatriate basketball people in the Czech Republic
American expatriate basketball people in the Dominican Republic
Antwerp Giants players
Basketball players from Virginia
Basket Zielona Góra players
Centers (basketball)
Basketball Nymburk players
Florida State Seminoles men's basketball players
Georgetown Hoyas men's basketball players
K.A.O.D. B.C. players
Keravnos B.C. players
P.A.O.K. BC players
Power forwards (basketball)
Sportspeople from Fairfax, Virginia
American men's basketball players